The 2015 Swiss Open Gstaad presented by Visilab was a men's tennis tournament played on outdoor clay courts. It was the 48th edition of the Swiss Open, and part of the ATP World Tour 250 Series of the 2015 ATP World Tour. It took place at the Roy Emerson Arena in Gstaad, Switzerland, from 27 July through 2 August 2015. Third-seeded Dominic Thiem won the singles title.

Singles main draw entrants

Seeds 

 1 Rankings are as of July 20, 2015

Other entrants 
The following players received wildcards into the singles main draw:
  Marco Chiudinelli
  Henri Laaksonen
  Andrey Rublev

The following players received entry from the qualifying draw:
  Calvin Hemery
  Julian Reister
  Maxime Teixeira
  Horacio Zeballos

Withdrawals 
Before the tournament
  Stan Wawrinka →replaced by Kimmer Coppejans

Retirements 
  Blaž Kavčič

Doubles main draw entrants

Seeds 

 Rankings are as of July 20, 2015

Other entrants 
The following pairs received wildcards into the doubles main draw:
  Adrien Bossel /  Marco Chiudinelli
  Henri Laaksonen /  Luca Margaroli

Finals

Singles 

  Dominic Thiem defeated  David Goffin, 7–5, 6–2

Doubles 

  Aliaksandr Bury /  Denis Istomin defeated  Oliver Marach /  Aisam-ul-Haq Qureshi, 3–6, 6–2, [10–5]

External links 
 

Swiss Open Gstaad
Swiss Open (tennis)
2015 in Swiss tennis